Admiral Widodo Adi Sutjipto (born 1 August 1944) is a former Commander of the National Armed Forces (TNI) of Indonesia.

He was the first commander coming from service branch other than army.

References

1944 births
Living people
People from Boyolali Regency
Indonesian admirals
Indonesian Muslims
Javanese people
Chiefs of Staff of the Indonesian Navy